Osman II ( ‘Osmān-i sānī; ; 3 November 1604 – 20 May 1622), also known as Osman the Young, was the sultan of the Ottoman Empire from 26 February 1618 until his regicide on 20 May 1622.

Early life

Osman II was born at Topkapı Palace, Constantinople, the son of Sultan Ahmed I (1603–17) and one of his consorts Mahfiruz Hatun. According to later traditions, at a young age, his mother had paid a great deal of attention to Osman's education, as a result of which Osman II became a known poet and was believed to have mastered many languages, including Arabic, Persian, Greek, Latin, and Italian; although this has since been refuted.   Osman was born eleven months after his father Ahmed's transition to the throne.  He was trained in the palace.  According to foreign observers, he was one of the most cultured of Ottoman princes. 

Osman's failure to capture the throne at the death of his father Ahmed might have been caused by the absence of a mother to lobby in his favour; his own mother was probably already dead or in exile.

Reign
Osman II ascended the throne at the age of 14 as the result of a coup d'état against his uncle Mustafa I "the Intestable" (1617–1618, 1622–1623). Despite his youth, Osman II soon sought to assert himself as a ruler, and after securing the empire's eastern border by signing a peace treaty (Treaty of Serav) with Safavid Persia, he personally led the Ottoman campaign against Poland and King Sigismund III during the Moldavian Magnate Wars. Forced to sign a humiliating peace treaty with the Poles after the Battle of Khotyn (Chocim) in September–October, 1621, Osman II returned home to Constantinople in shame, blaming the cowardice of the Janissaries and the insufficiency of his statesmen for his humiliation.

The basic and exceptional weakness from which Osman II suffered was the conspicuous absence of a female power basis in the harem. From 1620 until Osman's death, a governess (daye hatun, lit. wet-nurse) was appointed as a stand-in valide, and she could not counterbalance the contriving of Mustafa I's mother in the Old Palace. Although he did have a loyal chief black eunuch at his side, this could not compensate for the absence of what in the politics of that period was a winning combination, valide sultan–chief black eunuch, especially in the case of a young and very ambitious ruler. According to Piterberg, Osman II did not have haseki sultan, opposite with Peirce who claim that Ayşe was Osman's haseki. But it is clear that Ayşe could not take valide's role during her spouse's reign.In the autumn of 1620, Özi Beylerbeyi İskender Pasha seized the secret letter sent by Transylvanian Prince Bethlen Gabor to Istanbul and sent it to Poland, and  Osman also became a veteran of the people around him.  He decided to embark on a Polish expedition.   Continuing preparations for the Polish campaign, neither cold nor famine nor the English ambassador John Eyre could deter Osman. The ambassador of Sigismund III, the King of Poland, was brought into Istanbul despite the severe colds. The janissaries and army were not willing to go on a campaign, regardless of their conditions.

Great winter of 1621
Following the murder of Şehzade Mehmed on 12 January 1621, a severe snow started in Istanbul. The people of Istanbul were drastically affected by the cold, which increased local violence on 24 January, more so than the palace murder. This is the biggest natural disaster that concerns the capital in Osman's four-year short reign.  Bostanzade Yahya Efendi, one of those who lived through this cold, tells that the Golden Horn and the Bosphorus were covered with ice in the end of January-beginning of February: "Between Üsküdar and Beşiktaş, the men walk around and go to Üsküdar.  They came from Istanbul on foot. And the year became a gala (famine).

It was snowing for 15 days, that the frosts were frozen from the severity of the cold, but that the river was open between Sarayburnu and Üsküdar. For this natural disaster, thirty thousand froze between Üsküdar and Istanbul from the cold," Haşimi Çelebi, "The road became Üsküdar, the Mediterranean froze a thousand thirty".  As a result of the inconvenience of the Zahire ships, there was a complete famine in Istanbul, and 75 dirhams of bread jumped to one akche, and the oak of the meat to 15 akches.

Death

Seeking a counterweight to Janissary influence, Osman II closed their coffee shops (the gathering points for conspiracies against the throne) and started planning to create a new and more loyal army consisting of Anatolian sekbans. The result was a palace uprising by the Janissaries, who promptly imprisoned the young sultan in Yedikule Fortress in Istanbul, where Osman II was strangled to death. After Osman's death, his ear was cut off and represented to Halime Sultan and Sultan Mustafa I to confirm his death and Mustafa would no longer need to fear his nephew. It was the first time in the Ottoman history that a sultan was executed by the Janissaries.

This disaster is one of the most discussed topics in Ottoman history.  Hasanbegzade, Karaçelebizade, Solakzade, Peçevi, Müneccimbaşı and Naima dates, in the Fezleke of Katip Çelebi, detailed and some of them were narrated in a story style.

Family

Consorts
Osman II had four consorts:
Ayşe Sultan or Ayşe Hatun. Nothing is known about her except her name and her role is controversial. She was Osman's haseki according to Leslie Pierce, but not for other historical as Pitemberg. Finally, some historians identify her with Pertev Mehmed's granddaughter, and therefore as a free woman and Osman's first legal wife. She died in Old Palace in 1640.
Fülane Hatun. The unnamed daughter of an astrologer, and granddaughter of Pertev Mehmed Pasha. Some identify her with Ayşe Sultan/Hatun, but her identity is not yet known with certainty. Their marriage, in 7 February 1622, was extremely controversial, contrary to the tradition of a sultan marrying a muslim ottoman woman of free birth.
 Meylişah Hatun, called also Meleksima Hatun, Mehlikaya Hatun or Mehlika Hatun. Before entering the harem she was a slave of the Grand Vizier Kuyucu Murad Paşah. Favorite of Osman, maybe Russian, and mother of his eldest son, Şehzade Ömer. According to a minor version, after Kuyucu Murad's death, she was freed and adopted by the kızları agasi, and was therefore a free woman when she met Osman, who therefore married her legally in order to have her. She was his most beloved and influential consort, but fell out of grace following the accidental death of her son. Accused of the incident by a grieving Osman, who did not want to see her again, she was expelled from court and died in exile.
 Akile Hatun, daughter of Şeyhülislam Hocazade Esad Efendi, and his second legal wife.

Sons
Osman II had at least two sons:
Şehzade Ömer (20 October 1621, Constantinople – 5 February 1622, Edirne. Buried with his father in the Blue Mosque) – with Meylişah Hatun. News of his birth reached his father in Edirne, while he was returning from the Polish Campaign. To celebrate the event, he invited the court to join him there, including the child with his mother, and organized a party that included a reenactment of his battles in Poland which Meylişah and Ömer witnessed, but during the re-enactment a stray bullet hit the infant killing him. Another version is that the baby died from the shock caused by the noise of the guns. Later, rumors also spread that the prince was deliberately killed. In any case, his mother was accused of the incident and was exiled.
Şehzade Mustafa (November 1622, Constantinople – 1623, Constantinople. Buried with his father in the Blue Mosque) - maybe with Akile Hatun. Twin of Zeynep Sultan, born after the dethronement and killing of his father, his mother's identity is uncertain. Maybe he was killed by order of Halime Sultan, who acted as regent for his son and Osman's uncle, the new Sultan Mustafa I, while some other indicated he died for natural causes.

Daughters
Osman II had at least a daughter:
Zeynep Sultan (November 1622, Constantinople –  1623, Constantinople. Buried with her father in the Blue Mosque) - maybe with Akile Hatun. Twin of Şehzade Mustafa, born after the dethronement and killing of her father, her mother's identity is uncertain. She died as newborn of unknown causes.

In popular culture 
In the 2015 Turkish television series Muhteşem Yüzyıl: Kösem, Osman II was portrayed by actor Taner Ölmez.

See also
Transformation of the Ottoman Empire

Notes

Bibliography

Çiçek, Fikri (2014). An examination of daily politics and factionalism at the Ottoman Imperial court in relation to the regicide of Osman II (r. 1618-22). Istanbul Şehir University.

External links

17th-century poets from the Ottoman Empire
1604 births
1622 deaths
Modern child monarchs
17th-century murdered monarchs
Executed monarchs
17th-century Ottoman sultans
Royalty from Istanbul
Assassinated people from the Ottoman Empire
Ottoman sultans born to Greek mothers
Turks from the Ottoman Empire
People of the Polish–Ottoman War (1620–21)
People executed by ligature strangulation
Male poets from the Ottoman Empire
Assassinations in the Ottoman Empire
Murder in 1622